Epideira gabensis is a species of sea snail, a marine gastropod mollusk in the family Horaiclavidae, the turrids.

Description

Distribution

References

gabensis
Gastropods described in 1922